Korean Augmentation To the United States Army (KATUSA
Korean: 카투사) is a branch of the Republic of Korea Army that consists of Korean enlisted personnel who are augmented to the Eighth United States Army (EUSA). KATUSA does not form an individual military unit, instead small numbers of KATUSA members are dispatched throughout the most of the Eighth United States Army departments, filling in positions for the United States Army enlisted soldiers and junior non-commissioned officers. KATUSAs are selected from a pool of qualified volunteers who are subjected to mandatory military service for Korean male citizens.

While the ROK Army holds responsibility for personnel management of KATUSAs, KATUSA members are equipped with standard United States Army issues, and live and work with the U.S. enlisted soldiers. This kind of augmentation is unique throughout the entire United States Army worldwide, because the KATUSA program was developed during Korean War as a temporary measure to cope with a shortage of personnel in the United States Army.

Purpose
The KATUSA program provides the U.S. military with Korean-speaking soldiers, allowing greater military functionality and maneuverability throughout the Korean peninsula. KATUSA soldiers are assigned to each Eighth United States Army units with their Military Occupational Specialty like the United States Army soldiers and do the part of their MOS. Additionally, KATUSA soldiers serve as translators between the local populace and the U.S. Army, and help the U.S. maneuver in unfamiliar terrain. Informally, they help U.S. soldiers new to the peninsula understand Korean customs and a bit of the language.  It saves the U.S. money and manpower, and symbolizes the two nations' friendship and mutual support. The KATUSA program remains essential for the safety of the Republic of Korea, not only for establishing partnerships with American Armed Forces, but to learn from each other and to assist each other, especially with the threat of North Korea looming over South Korea.

According to Richard Weiz (2013), author of "An Enduring Partnership: South Korea and the United States", The North Korean threat continues to provide the fundamental basis for the ROK-U.S. security relationship...The most recent period of tensions flared up after the North's long-range rocket launch in December 2012 and underground nuclear test in February 2013" (Pg. 310). Providing valuable information on the peninsula as well as translations, KATUSA soldiers carry out their MOS effectively, allowing for a future of more foreign cooperation with America. Nirav Patel and Lindsey Ford (2009), authors of "The future of the U.S.-ROK alliance: global perspectives" go on to state that "The alliance between the United States and the Republic of Korea (ROK) has been a key component of America’s bilateral alliance system in Asia for almost 60 years. 

South Korea has been a close friend and valued partner during difficult circumstances, even when personal relations between U.S. and ROK leaders were at a low ebb"

History
The KATUSA system was established in July 1950 during the Korean War. It was started as a spoken agreement between President Seungman Lee and U.S. General Douglas MacArthur. At that time, the U.S. Army needed a military force that had the proper knowledge of the geography of Korea, and the abilities to distinguish ally troops (South Korea) from enemy troops (North Korea) and communicate better between U.S. soldiers and Korean soldiers. Therefore, some were drafted to KATUSA by force, and others voluntarily (by their own choice) applied. After training, they were divided into the U.S. military, such as 2nd, 7th, 24th, 25th divisions. During the Korean Wars, a total 43,660 KATUSA soldiers fought for South Korea with U.S. forces. Of these soldiers, 11,365 went missing or were killed in action. 

This program continued after the Korean War, and KATUSA soldiers would spend 18-months with the U.S. Army learning his occupation and would then return to the ROK Army for training others on the occupation. According to the Eighth Army Wightman NCO Academy, "With the establishment of the ROKA Training Center in 1963…KATUSA soldiers began to spend their whole military tour in the U.S. Army"

KATUSA Code of Conduct

Selection process
To become a KATUSA, eligible Korean draftees who've demonstrated a minimum level of English-language proficiency by achieving minimum passing scores on standardized English tests. There are eight different exams, and people can choose one from them. The eight exams are: TOEFL, TOEIC, TEPS, G-TEP LEVEL 2, FLEX, OPIC, TOEIC SPEAKING and TEPS SPEAKING. Typically, the three most popular exams people take are TOEFL, TOEIC, TEPS, and the minimum scores for getting into the lottery are 83 for TOEFL, 780 for TOEIC, and 690 for TEPS. They may apply through the Military Manpower Administration(MMA), upon which their name is entered into a lottery system. As the selection process is completely random, all eligible candidates have an equal chance of winning.  Applicants may only apply once.

Qualified Korean draftees who demonstrate a high level of English fluency and aptitude via a standardized written exam (usually the TOEIC) may apply for a KATUSA slot. Conscripts with qualifying test scores are selected on a random basis via lottery by the Korean government. Once selected, KATUSAs must complete six-weeks of ROK Army basic training. A brief orientation and OJT is conducted by the U.S. Army before they begin their full-time duty with a United States Army unit garrisoned in Korea for the duration of their military service.

The number of candidates vying for an available opening is extremely high because many soldiers believe that the U.S. Army is less abusive and more professional in its training and treatment of soldiers compared with the ROK Army, and that junior enlisted personnel receive better treatment, have more educational opportunities (especially with regards to learning English), experience a higher standard of living, and have an overall better quality of life than their ROK counterparts. In 2012, roughly 3,400 KATUSA soldiers served with 25,000 United States Forces Korea (USFK), versus 4,800 in 2005 and 11,000 in 1968. As the number of U.S. soldiers in South Korea decreases, the number of KATUSA soldiers is decreasing as well. The ratio of KATUSA soldiers to U.S. soldiers is roughly 1:10.

U.S. Air Force
While many Republic of Korea Air Force members in Korea work alongside U.S. Air Force members, there is no KATUSA program with the USAF counterpart; ROKAF retains their own unit and command structure separate from their USAF counterparts.

Criticism
Since the KATUSA program started off as a temporary measure during the war and has continued in a like manner, there has been no legal legitimisation of the program under Korean law to date. The oral agreement between General MacArthur and President Rhee on conscripting Korean civilians for the U.S. Forces was never documented. A memorandum for assigning operational command of the ROK Army to General MacArthur by President Rhee, known as Pusan Letter, is considered the only justification for the KATUSA program in South Korea. EUSA designates the state of KATUSA program in Army in Korea Regulation 600-2.

Since KATUSA soldiers do not undergo special education for their MOS before their deployment and their mission training relies heavily on OJT from senior to junior KATUSAs, new KATUSAs usually take a few months of incubatory period before they can fully perform.

One criticism of the KATUSA program arises from the difference in promotion systems; the ROK Army promotes its enlistees on a quota/time basis and not through the merit system. A KATUSA soldier may be senior in rank to an American counterpart with significantly more field experience. However, this criticism is usually rebutted by the counter-argument from the United States Forces Korea that such promotion of KATUSA soldiers is sufficiently warranted given the fact that KATUSA soldiers usually possess at least two years of college experience, which would translate to an advanced enlisted rank for US soldiers.

Another criticism arising from the Korean Army side is based on the fact that most of the KATUSA soldiers are from the top universities in Korea. For the ROKA, this means that they are losing intelligent soldiers to the US Army. To minimize this, the selection process now randomly picks soldiers from the pool of applicants, instead of hiring the most qualified soldiers.

The selection process requires applicants to submit their English proficiency test scores as a mandatory document, and driver's license and computer software proficiency test scores such as Microsoft certificates to qualify applicants who are eligible to be drivers or administrators. These measures were introduced to diversify the pool of applicants throughout Korean Army soldiers, but a lot of intelligent soldiers still enlist as a KATUSA for the superior facilities and treatment. A holistic and random approach is used to quality candidates into different units, and this variety of exam results seems to affect significantly into which positions each applicant is placed.

Some of the recent criticisms from the South Korean side include alleged forced-recruitment during the 1950–53 Korean War, when the 7th Infantry Division commandeered reinforcements for the landing at Incheon. These so-called "First KATUSA soldiers" included 313 men from Busan.  (The South Korean side claims they were taken from refugee camps, but whether they volunteered or were coerced remains a matter of dispute.)

See also
KATCOM, a similar system operating in the 1st Commonwealth Division.

References

Further reading
 Appleman, Roy (1961). South to the Naktong, North to the Yalu: June–November, 1950.
 Blair, Clay (1987). The Forgotten War: America in Korea, 1950–1953.
 Hermes, Walter (1966). Truce Tent and Fighting Front, United States Army in the Korean War.
 Mossman, Billy (1990). Ebb and Flow: November 1950–July 1951 United States Army in the Korean War.
 Sandler, Stanley (ed.). The Korean War: An Encyclopedia. Garland Publishing.
 Skaggs, D.C. (1974). The KATUSA Experiment: The Integration of Korean Nationals into the U.S. Army, 1950≠1965.
 Stanton, Shelby (1989). American's Tenth Legion: X Corps in Korea, 1950.

External links

 KATUSA on Facebook
 Eighth U.S. Army ROKA Support Group on Facebook

United States military in South Korea
Republic of Korea Army
Expatriate military units and formations
Military units and formations established in 1950